Bells is a city in Grayson County, Texas, United States. The population was 1,392 at the 2010 census, up from 1,190 at the 2000 census. The city lies north of Dallas and is part of the Sherman–Denison Metropolitan Statistical Area.

History

Bells had its start in the early 1870s when the railroad was extended to that point. According to local tradition, the ringing of church bells to greet the arrival of the railroad caused the name to be selected.

Geography
Bells is located in eastern Grayson County, at the intersection of U.S. Route 69 and Texas State Highway 56. US 69 leads northwest  to Denison and south  to Whitewright, while Highway 56 leads west  to Sherman, the Grayson County seat, and east  to Bonham. U.S. Route 82, a four-lane freeway, passes through the northern part of Bells, also leading to Sherman and Bonham.

Demographics

2020 census

As of the 2020 United States census, there were 1,521 people, 673 households, and 475 families residing in the town.

2000 census
As of the census of 2000, there were 654 people, 484 households, and 345 families residing in the town. The population density was 520.7 people per square mile (200.6/km2). There were 525 housing units at an average density of 229.7 per square mile (88.5/km2). The racial makeup of the town was 94.96% White, 0.17% African American, 1.01% Native American, 0.17% Asian, 0.34% Pacific Islander, 0.92% from other races, and 2.44% from two or more races. Hispanic or Latino of any race were 1.68% of the population.

There were 484 households, out of which 32.4% had children under the age of 18 living with them, 56.4% were married couples living together, 10.3% had a female householder with no husband present, and 28.7% were non-families. 26.2% of all households were made up of individuals, and 12.6% had someone living alone who was 65 years of age or older. The average household size was 2.46 and the average family size was 2.94.

In the town, the population was spread out, with 26.5% under the age of 18, 7.2% from 18 to 24, 30.2% from 25 to 44, 19.8% from 45 to 64, and 16.3% who were 65 years of age or older. The median age was 35 years. For every 100 females, there were 92.9 males. For every 100 females age 18 and over, there were 94.0 males.

The median income for a household in the town was $36,711, and the median income for a family was $44,500. Males had a median income of $32,596 versus $22,500 for females. The per capita income for the town was $17,089. About 9.0% of families and 13.4% of the population were below the poverty line, including 20.8% of those under age 18 and 11.6% of those age 65 or over.

Education
The town is served by the Bells Independent School District, with an elementary, junior high and high school.

References

External links
 
 

Towns in Grayson County, Texas
Towns in Texas